Machaerocera is a genus of band-winged grasshoppers in the family Acrididae. This genus has a single species, Machaerocera mexicana. It is found in Mexico, the southwestern United States, and in Central and South America.

References

External links

 

Acrididae
Monotypic Orthoptera genera